Heyran-e Vosta (also Romanized as Ḩeyrān-e Vosţá; also known as Ḩeyrān-e Mīānī) is a village in Heyran Rural District, in the Central District of Astara County, Gilan Province, Iran. At the 2006 census, its population was 65, in 16 families.

Language 
Linguistic composition of the village.

References 

Populated places in Astara County

Azerbaijani settlements in Gilan Province